Estádio de Nossa Senhora do Monte is a multi-use stadium in Lubango, Angola.

In 2010, the stadium underwent major renovation in the framework of the 2010 Africa Cup of Nations to serve as the group D training ground.

In 2014, The state-owned stadium has been handed over to Clube Desportivo da Huila for management and tenancy purposes. The stadium holds 12,000 people.

References

Buildings and structures in Lubango
Nossa